The following highways are numbered 814:

Costa Rica
 National Route 814

United States